The Kansas City Massacre is a 1975 American television film about Melvin Purvis. It is the second spin-off of the 1973 film Dillinger, following Melvin Purvis: G-Man in 1974, also directed by Dan Curtis and starring Dale Robertson as Purvis.

Plot
Gangsters free one of their colleagues being escorted to prison and kill several FBI agents and local police officers in the attempt. FBI agent Melvin Purvis puts together a special squad to track down and capture the men responsible.

Cast
 Dale Robertson as FBI Agent Melvin Purvis
 Bo Hopkins as Charles "Pretty Boy" Floyd
 Elliott Street as George "Baby Face" Nelson
 Harris Yulin as John Lazia
 Matt Clark as Verne Miller
 Scott Brady as Commissioner Herbert Tucker McElwaine
 John Karlen as FBI Agent Sam Cowley
 Lynn Loring as Vi Morland
 Robert Walden as Adam Richetti
 Mills Watson as Frank "Jelly" Nash
Philip Bruns as Captain Jackson
 William Jordan as John Dillinger
 Sally Kirkland as Wilma Floyd
 Morgan Paull as Alvin Karpis
 Ike Eisenmann as Jimmie Floyd
 Brion James as Homer Van Meter
 James Gammon as Garth

Production
Filming was done in Marysville, California.

Reception
The Los Angeles Times called it "a smartly produced, sharply acted slice of TV entertainment."

See also
 List of American films of 1975

References

External links

1975 television films
1975 films
1970s crime drama films
Biographical films about Depression-era gangsters
American television films
American crime drama films
Cultural depictions of Baby Face Nelson
Cultural depictions of Pretty Boy Floyd
Films directed by Dan Curtis
1975 drama films
1970s American films